Wiremu Katene (died 1 November 1895), also known as Wi Katene, was a New Zealand politician.

In 1872 he became the first Māori to be appointed to the Executive Council, becoming the first indigenous Minister of the Crown.

He died on 1 November 1895.

References

 Te Ara biography of Wiremu Parata appointed to the Executive Council a month after Katene
 Wiremu Katene's biography on the Victoria University NZETC website

1895 deaths
New Zealand MPs for Māori electorates
Members of the New Zealand House of Representatives
Members of the Cabinet of New Zealand
Unsuccessful candidates in the 1890 New Zealand general election
Unsuccessful candidates in the 1887 New Zealand general election
19th-century New Zealand politicians